Tell Tamer Subdistrict  is an ethnically Assyrian and Syriac subdistrict of al-Hasakah District in western al-Hasakah Governorate, northeastern Syria. The administrative centre is the city of Tell Tamer.

At the 2004 census, the subdistrict had a population of 50,982. Assyrians from the Assyrian Church of the East constitute about 40% of the population of this district, with the rest being adherents of other Assyrian churches such as the Chaldean Catholic Church and Syriac Orthodox Church. There is also Kurds and Arabs. It is the headquarter of the Assyrian Khabour Guards and Nattoreh militias, as well as the location of a large Syriac Orthodox Monastery.

Cities, towns and villages

References 

Al-Hasakah District
Tell Tamer